Mesh Computers Limited is a private computer company based in London, England. As well as being a manufacturer of personal computers, the company sells peripherals and components through their website.

History

Founded in 1987, during its first 20 years of business, Mesh Computers could only be purchased directly from the manufacturer; however, in November 2006, MESH began to sell through major retailers like Comet Group.

Mesh Computers has recently opened up a number of new routes to market, including resellers in the UK like Ebuyer.
In 2009, Mesh announced the MESH Cute home theatre PC, in a variety of colours for the living room.

The BBC created a series of programmes to teach school children about computer technology and advanced production techniques in a modern factory setting and MESH was filmed as one of the examples, alongside Rolls-Royce and Coca-Cola.

Mesh was the last of the major UK PC manufacturers that still create custom-built PCs for end users. At its peak, the mainstream market was full of local brands like Evesham Technology, Granville Technology (Tiny/Time), Elonex, Opus, Cube Enterprises, MJN and Dan; most of them shut down in the Great Recession.
Viglen and RM Plc continued to operate, but specialise in education systems.

Mesh computers appeared on Watchdog having been accused of having inadequate customer support and services.
In the summer of 2010, Mesh Computers was voted PC Manufacturer of the Year by both Computer Shopper magazine and the Expert Reviews web site.
MESH reviews have been mixed.

Administration
On 31 May 2011 it was announced that Mesh Computers had gone into administration under the law firm MacIntyre Hudson, and that key assets had been bought by components firm PC Peripherals, owned by Reza Jafari.

In February 2012, the owner of Mesh (and its largest creditor) at the time it went into administration, Mehdi ("Max") Sherafati, was appointed a director of PC Peripherals, effectively regaining control.

References

External links
Mesh Computers website

Computer companies of the United Kingdom
Computer companies established in 1987
1987 establishments in England
Companies that have entered administration in the United Kingdom